Motif is a 2019 Malaysian Malay-language crime drama film. In the film, a missing girl in a small town is suddenly murdered. A female police investigator have to solve the case, while the prime suspect might be the girl's father.

It is released on 26 September 2019 in Malaysia.

Synopsis
Inspector Dewi (Sharifah Armani) is an intelligent female inspector who is assigned to investigate the case of missing teen girl, Anna in the town of Tanah Merah. Anna was last seen in an old hotel. She is assigned with the local Inspector Rizal (Taqim Zaki). However, she is not welcomed by the town, especially from the father of the missing girl, Hussein (Rosyam Nor) who is a powerful figure in the town and has prejudice towards women. Meanwhile, Dewi also struggles with her personal life as she is having polygamy relationship with a guy who has a first wife. When Anna is discovered murdered, everyone besides Anna becomes suspect, can Dewi solve the slow-burn murder case?

Cast
 Sharifah Amani as Inspector Dewi
 Rosyam Nor as Hussein, father of Anna
 Iedil Dzuhrie Alaudin as Faisal
 Taqim Zaki as Inspector Rizal
 Emma Tosh as Yasmin
 Khalid Salleh as Father's Yasmin
 Nadia Aqilah as Lena, voice
 Izze Azzam as Konstabel Hanif
 Sherie Merlis as Suri, mother of Anna
 Khayrani Kemal as Anna Hussein
 Sharmin Edora as Anis Hussein
 Fadhli Masoot as Azlan 
 Azhan Rani as Kamal
 Kenji Sawahi as ASP Zamri
 Azman Hassan as Syukur
 Ho Yuhang as Lim
 Sakonlawat Khetboon as Surin
 Lee Ming as Ming
 Redza Minhat as IIham, voice
 Khairunazwan Rodzy as Bakar
 Ken Zuraida as Mother's Yasmin
 Muslim as Konstabel Ihsan

References

External links
 
 Motif on Cinema.com.my

Malaysian crime drama films
Malay-language films
2019 films